The list of shipwrecks in May 1886 includes ships sunk, foundered, grounded, or otherwise lost during May 1886.

3 May

4 May

5 May

6 May

7 May

9 May

10 May

11 May

13 May

15 May

17 May

18 May

20 May

23 May

24 May

29 May

30 May

Unknown date

References

1886-05
Maritime incidents in May 1886